Northern District or North District may refer to several places:

Asia
North District, Hong Kong
North District, Hsinchu City, Taiwan
North District, Tainan, Tainan
North District, Taichung, Taiwan
Northern Districts (ku) in Japan, see Kita-ku (disambiguation)
Northern Districts (gu) in Korea, see Buk-gu (disambiguation)

Australia
North District, Western Australia, an obsolete administrative division of the Colony of Western Australia
Northern District (South Australian Legislative Council), an electoral district 1882–1975

Europe and Middle East
Northern District (Israel)
Northern District, Malta
Northern District, Riga, Latvia
Severny District, name of various places in Russia (Severny in Russian means "Northern")

North America
Several internal divisions within states of the United States:
Northern District of Illinois
Northern District of Iowa
Northern District of New York
Northern District of Texas

See also 
北区 (disambiguation)

District name disambiguation pages